Ignacio Perez Quitugua (February 7, 1909 – October 15, 1973) was a Guamanian politician, serving 2 terms in the Guam Legislature.

Guam Legislature

Elections
Ignacio P. Quitugua was elected to and served in the 1st and the 9th Guam Legislatures.

Personal life
In May 1969, Quitugua was conferred an honorary Bachelor of Community Service as a Distinguished Educator by the College of Guam.

Quitugua was the father of former Speaker of the Guam Legislature Franklin Joseph Arceo Quitugua and great-grandfather of Congressman Michael F.Q. San Nicolas.

References

1909 births
1973 deaths
20th-century American politicians
Chamorro people
Guamanian Democrats
Guamanian Roman Catholics
Members of the Legislature of Guam